Bagniewko refers to the following places in Poland:

 Bagniewko, Kuyavian-Pomeranian Voivodeship
 Bagniewko, West Pomeranian Voivodeship